Tigers on the Prowl is a 1994 video game by American studio HPS Simulations for DOS.

Gameplay
Tigers on the Prowl is a tactical wargame involving combat on land in World War II.

Reception

In 1996, Computer Gaming World declared Tigers on the Prowl the 148th-best computer game ever released. The magazine's wargame columnist Terry Coleman named it his pick for the 11th-best computer wargame released by late 1996.

Reviews
PC Gamer Vol. 1 No. 3 (1994 August)
Computer Gaming World (Sep, 1994)

References

1994 video games
Computer wargames
DOS games
DOS-only games
Video games developed in the United States
World War II video games